White Man's Legend is a 1984 Australian television film directed by Geoffrey Nottage and starring Bill Kerr, Patti Crocker and Deryck Barnes. The screenplay concerns an old seaman who buys a boat.

References

1984 television films
1984 films
Australian television films
1980s English-language films